The 1972–73 season was Stoke City's 66th season in the Football League and the 42nd in the First Division.

After the jubilation of last season's success the club was able to sign world cup winner Geoff Hurst which boosted season ticket sales. They also entered European competition for the first time losing 5–3 on aggregate to German side 1. FC Kaiserslautern. Stoke failed to build on last season and had to settle for a mid table position of 15th.

Season review

League
After winning the League Cup last season there was a number of notable departures during the early part of the season. They sold Mike Bernard to Everton for a record £140,000, with the money being spent on Jimmy Robertson from Ipswich Town and World Cup winner Geoff Hurst from West Ham United. Stoke now had an abundance of attacking talent but both Harry Burrows and Peter Dobing decided to retire during the season.

The arrival of Hurst certainly boosted season ticket sales and a record takings were banked before a ball was kicked prior to the start of the 1972–73 season. It proved that the public of Stoke-on-Trent were now right behind the team but despite high hopes and expectations, the "Potters" started the new campaign rather poorly and found themselves in the bottom six. Stoke's immediate plans were hit when on the Sunday morning of 22 October 1972 after visiting the Victoria Ground for treatment Gordon Banks crashed his car on the way home and effectively ended his career. Such was the scale of Banks' presence his condition was headline news. Realising that Banks was to be out of action for quite some time Waddington moved in for Scotland international Bobby Clark, but the deal fell through as he failed to impress the Stoke directors. Mike McDonald was signed instead from Clydebank as cover for John Farmer after it was learnt that Banks had lost an eye and would never play competitive football again.

George Eastham returned to the club in February after spending time doing coaching work in South Africa, he added his experience to the cause as he helped Stoke to recover and take 15th place. Three players reached double figures in the league scoring charts this term, Jimmy Greenhoff (16), John Ritchie (14) and Geoff Hurst (10) as Stoke scored 61 goals. They ended the season with a tour of Oceania.

FA Cup
In the FA Cup Stoke went out in the third round losing 3–2 to Manchester City at Maine Road.

League Cup
As holders of the League Cup, Stoke started off with high hopes of retaining the trophy and they began with good wins over Sunderland (3–0) and Ipswich Town (2–1)  but a bad night at Notts County (1–3) in the fourth round put paid to any hopes of a return to Wembley.

UEFA Cup
Their success in the 1972 Football League Cup Final, had placed them into a European competition for the first time, and they drew little known West German side 1. FC Kaiserslautern in the first round. A comfortable 3–1 home win was achieved in the first leg and two weeks later Waddington favoured a defensive team for the match at the Fritz-Walter-Stadion. The plan backed fired and Stoke were crushed 4–0 with John Ritchie being sent-off just seconds after being brought on as a substitute without even touching the ball.

Final league table

Results

Stoke's score comes first

Legend

Football League First Division

FA Cup

League Cup

UEFA Cup

Friendlies

Squad statistics

Notes

References

Stoke City F.C. seasons
Stoke